Warpath: Jurassic Park is a fighting video game released on the PlayStation console in 1999. It is a spin-off of the films Jurassic Park and The Lost World: Jurassic Park, in turn adapted from novels written by Michael Crichton. It was developed by Black Ops Entertainment and co-published by Electronic Arts and DreamWorks Interactive.

Gameplay
Warpath is a fighting game. The player can choose a dinosaur to fight with against other dinosaurs. The player starts with eight dinosaurs, including T. rex, Giganotosaurus, Ankylosaurus, Stygimoloch, and Styracosaurus. Six additional dinosaurs can be unlocked in Arcade mode, including Carcharodontosaurus, Cryolophosaurus, Pachycephalosaurus, Spinosaurus, and Triceratops. Each dinosaur has its own array of fighting techniques and style.

The game includes various arenas that recreate locations from the first two films, such as the T. rex enclosure from Jurassic Park and the S.S. Venture deck from The Lost World: Jurassic Park. Some arenas feature destructible objects such as boxes, which will hurt the dinosaurs when they break them. Optionally, various edible creatures (goats, humans, dogs, and Compsognathus) will scurry across the arena, partially replenishing lost health when eaten or killed by one of the fighters.

The game features a variety of modes:
 The main mode is Arcade. In this mode the player must face each dinosaur in the game through 8 fights. This mode has a time limit and round limit, though it can be changed in the options menu.
 Versus mode has the player going up against a second player. The players can choose the dinosaur and the arena. If the second player chooses the same dinosaur the skin changes to an alternative.
 Practice mode allows the player to try out moves and train against any dinosaur. The player can change the stance of the opponent to jumping, crouched or on ground. The opponent can also attack, but the player cannot die as it is just a simulation.
 Survival mode has the player going up against all dinosaurs in the same manner as a survival mode. A small amount of health is rewarded to the player for each dinosaur defeated. The object of this mode is to defeat all dinosaurs before the player's health meter is depleted.
 Choice mode is the same as Versus mode, except the player fights a CPU-controlled dinosaur.
Team mode is a mix of Survival and Versus modes, but with a team of four dinosaurs. The object of this mode is to defeat all of the opposing team's dinosaurs. Once a dinosaur is defeated, it is eliminated and another dinosaur will take its place until all four dinosaurs on either team are eliminated.
 Museum is a semi-educational mode that allows the player to browse through the dinosaurs and read or hear information on each one. The player can view the dinosaur's family, time of existence, and do other things like change its skin or hear pronunciation.

Featured dinosaurs
At the start of the game, the player has only a limited amount of choices (8 in total) for playable dinosaurs. Although this game predated Jurassic Park III, Spinosaurus and Jurassic World Dominion, Giganotosaurus was featured, however, as the game progresses, the player is presented the opportunity to unlock new playable characters making the total of available dinosaurs up to 14. Each dinosaur is associated with its own area, which - as the player starts the combat - features a small entering animation of the dinosaur that the player is about to fight.

Available from the start
 Acrocanthosaurus (Acro) - Featuring a 76 gas station from the second movie.
 Ankylosaurus (Anky) - Featuring the Visitors Centre of the first movie.
 Giganotosaurus (Giga) - Featuring the T-Rex Paddock Area of the first movie.
 Megaraptor (Raptor) - Featuring the Raptor Paddock Area of the first movie.
 Stygimoloch (Stygi) - Featuring the Lab Area of Site B from the second movie.
 Styracosaurus (Styrac) - Featuring the Heliport Landing Zone from the first movie.
 Suchomimus (Sucho) - Featuring the Park Entrance Area from the first movie.
 Tyrannosaurus rex (T-Rex) - Featuring the Cargo Ship from the second movie.

Unlockable
 Albertosaurus (Alberto) - Featuring a Universal Studios Theme Park as an easter-egg.
 Carcharodontosaurus (Carchar) - Featuring the jungle beneath the T-Rex Paddock from the first movie.
 Cryolophosaurus (Cryo) - Featuring a desert area. Video game-only area.
 Pachycephalosaurus (Pachy) - Featuring a mountainous area. Video game-only area.
 Spinosaurus (Spino) - Featuring the In-Gen Laboratory from the first movie.
 Triceratops (Trike) - Featuring the Hunters Camp Area from the second movie.

Development and release
Warpath: Jurassic Park was developed by Black Ops Entertainment. Although the dinosaurs are based on their real-life counterparts, artistic license was also used to give the animals unique abilities for gameplay purposes. Each of the dinosaurs consist of 750 polygons. The game's musical score was composed by Michael Giacchino, who previously worked on the 1997 video game The Lost World: Jurassic Park. Electronic Arts published the game. In the U.S. it was released on November 17, 1999.

Reception

Warpath was met with mixed reception upon release, as GameRankings gave it a score of 57.36%. The game was compared unfavorably to Primal Rage by GameSpot and IGN. Adam Pavlacka reviewed the game for Next Generation and wrote, "History has shown that the Jurassic Park license spells doom for any game it touches, and Warpath is no exception."

AllGame praised the game's dinosaur animations, and most of its interactive level designs for their resemblance to locations that were featured in the films, but criticized other levels for their "bland building textures and rushed backgrounds." AllGame found the gameplay to be "downright sluggish" and considered the music to be "too low and emotionless," and opined that cutscenes for each dinosaur "would've been a nice extra for the game's overall feel and replay value." GameSpot also praised the dinosaurs, but criticized the levels for glitching: "Surfaces buckle and distortion abounds as the PlayStation struggles to keep all this geometry under control."

Game Informer wrote, "Graphically, it's not a bad game. Unfortunately, the concept leaves much to be desired," noting that the gameplay "gets old rather quickly when you realize that the AI of the game is about the size of a peanut, and you can finish it with two moves." GamePro praised the graphics and sound, but criticized the game's "complex button patterns," writing, "By the time you master the combos, you'll be in the mood to play something else."

IGN criticized the game's dinosaurs for their lack of size disparity: "The T-Rex is a dwarf, while raptors have become mega-raptors of roughly the same size as the beast who bit regular raptors in half in the film." IGN also criticized the game's AI, bad collision detection, and noted that each dinosaur played similarly to one another. However, IGN praised the game's graphics and levels.

References

External links

1999 video games
3D fighting games
Electronic Arts games
Jurassic Park video games
Video games based on adaptations
PlayStation (console)-only games
DreamWorks Interactive games
Video games scored by Michael Giacchino
Multiplayer and single-player video games
PlayStation (console) games
Video games set on fictional islands
Video games set in Costa Rica
Video games set in San Diego
Video games developed in the United States
Black Ops Entertainment games